Marília Gabriela Baston de Toledo (born 31 May 1948), best known as Marília Gabriela or just Gabi, is a Brazilian journalist, TV host, actress, writer, and former singer.

Biography 
Marília began her journalist career in 1969,  as an intern at Rede Globo's Jornal Nacional. That same year she was invited to present the news program Jornal Hoje, in São Paulo. In 1973, she presented the TV show Fantástico, with a story about the anniversary of Carmen Miranda's death. After that she became special reporter for the program. In 1980, Marília became the main host of the program TV Mulher, together with Ney Gonçalves Dias  She recorded two albums under Som Livre and Universal Music, named Perdida de Amor, with participations of Simone and Caetano Veloso. After leaving TV Mulher, in 1984, she was TV Globo's correspondent in England for six months, besides doing news stories for Fantástico. Unhappy, she left TV Globo for Rede Bandeirantes. In 1985, she presented the variety shows Marília Gabi Gabriela, at TV Bandeirantes, and the talk show Cara a Cara.

With low ratings, Marília Gabi Gabriela show was canceled, leaving her only with Cara a Cara, on late Sunday nights; from 1987 to 1994 she also presented Jornal Bandeirantes. In 1989 she mediated the first presidential debate between the candidates Luiz Inácio Lula da Silva and Fernando Collor de Mello. After leaving TV Bandeirantes, she signed with Rede CNT for a short period. In 1997, she signed  with Sistema Brasileiro de Televisão, where she presented SBT Repórter and  talk show De Frente com Gabi. She also had a brief stint at RedeTV!.

Acting career 
Gabi debuted on stages in 2000, with the leading role in Gerald Thomas'  play Esperando Beckett,. She also acted in feature films and telenovelas. In the telenovela Senhora do Destino, de Aguinaldo Silva, Marília Gabriela played two characters in different timelines: Josefa Medeiros Duarte Pinto, a journalist, and her daughter, Guilhermina de Medeiros Duarte Pinto Lefevre.  After prioritizing her acting career at Rede Globo, and also presenting Marília Gabriela Entrevista on cable channel GNT, she returned to SBT in June 2010, back with De Frente com Gabi. On 6 July 2010 she signed with TV Cultura to present Roda Viva on Mondays, keeping her program on SBT on Sundays. Thus, Marília Gabriela passed to host three programs in three different channels. After a year at TV Cultura, SBT decided for her exclusivity on broadcast television. She left the channel in 2015.

Career

Television

Acting roles

Presenter

Cinema

Stage

Book 
 2008: Eu Que Amo Tanto (the book got a segment in the TV program Fantástico (Rede Globo), retelling some of its stories)

Discography

Albums 
 1982: Marília Gabriela
Label- Opus Columbia / Som Livre
 Tracks
 Diga Ao Povo Que Fico (Rita Lee / Roberto de Carvalho)
 Bicho de Estimação (Roberto Carlos / Erasmo Carlos)
 Ser, Fazer e Acontecer (Gonzaguinha)
 Essas Coisas que Eu Mal Sei (Marina Lima / Antônio Cícero)
 Sampa (Caetano Veloso)
 Dois Namorados (Guto Graça Mello / Naila Skorpio)
 Da Cor do Pecado (Bororó)
 O Que É, O Que É? (Milton Nascimento / Fernando Brant)
 Eramos Três (Tunai / Sergio Natureza)
 Cataclisma (Ivan Lins)
 Tomara (Caetano Veloso)
 1984: Marília Gabriela
Label - Som Livre
 Tracks
 Sampa
 Da Cor Do Pecado
 Albatroz
 Drão
 Mutante
 Cataclisma
 Diga Ao Povo Que Fico
 O Que É, O Que É
 Abrir A Porta
 Espelho
 Tomara
 Trem Das Cores
 2002: Perdida de Amor
Label- Universal Music
 Tracks
 Fotografia
 Loira
 Perdido de Amor
 Você
 Marina
 Este Seu Olhar
 Nem Eu
 Inútil Paisagem
 Alguém Como Tu
 Copacabana
 Copacabana Blade Runner
 Sábado Em Copacabana

References

External links 
 

1948 births
Actresses from São Paulo (state)
Living people
Brazilian actresses
Brazilian journalists
Brazilian women journalists
20th-century Brazilian women singers
20th-century Brazilian singers
People from Campinas
Brazilian women television presenters